The Pierson Limestone is a geologic formation in southwestern Missouri. It preserves fossils of the Mississippian subperiod including brachiopods and coral.

References

Mississippian Missouri